In telecommunications, and in the context of Federal Communications Commission's (FCC) Computer Inquiry III, Open network architecture (ONA) is the overall design of a communication carrier's basic network facilities and services to permit all users of the basic network to interconnect to specific basic network functions and interfaces on an unbundled, equal-access basis.

The ONA concept consists of three integral components:

 Basic serving arrangements (BSAs)
 Basic service elements (BSEs)
 Complementary network services

See also
 Open Garden

References

Network architecture